Maturi Venkat Sridhar (2 August 1965 – 30 October 2017) was an Indian first-class cricketer. He represented Hyderabad between 1988/89 and 1999/00, making 6701 runs at 48.91 with 21 hundreds. His highest score of 366 was the cornerstone for Hyderabad when they posted the record breaking total of 944/6 (declared) against Andhra in the 1993–94 Ranji Trophy; Noel David and Vivek Jaisimha scored double centuries. While Sridhar was batting, 850 runs were scored - the most runs added during a batsman's innings in first-class history. He was the secretary of MVSR Engineering College in Hyderabad.

Death
On 30 October 2017, Sridhar suffered a heart attack at his home. He was declared dead upon arrival at the hospital. He is survived by his wife, a son and a daughter.

References

External links
 

1966 births
2017 deaths
Hyderabad cricketers
South Zone cricketers
Indian cricketers
Indian cricket coaches
Cricketers from Andhra Pradesh